Holidays Rule is a collection of holiday music featuring various artists that range from indie rock to jazz and pop, including Paul McCartney, Rufus Wainwright, The Shins. The songs on the compilation are both traditional and modern. The album was released by Hear Music/Concord Music Group on October 30, 2012 in North America. Chris Funk of The Decemberists served as the album’s producer, and he also appears on the album with Black Prairie. It peaked at #42 on December 2012 Billboard album chart.

Track listing

Versions
On 26 November 2012, it was released in the UK by the name of Christmas Rule. 
After the success of volume the version was after 5 years with the "Holidays Rule Volume 2". It comprises 16 songs.

References

External links
 Official site

2012 compilation albums
2012 Christmas albums
Christmas compilation albums
Indie rock compilation albums
Hear Music compilation albums
Concord Music Group compilation albums
Alternative rock Christmas albums